The Twelve Local Heroes is a series of bronze busts in the central city of Christchurch, New Zealand on Worcester Boulevard outside the Arts Centre to commemorate twelve local Christchurch people who were prominent in their respective fields in the latter part of the 20th century.

History
The establishment of the commemorative sculptures was driven by the Twelve Local Heroes charitable trust. The project had been four years in the making before the bronze busts were unveiled on 18 March 2009. The artwork was produced by the sculptor Mark Whyte.

Local Heroes
The Twelve Local Heroes can be grouped by having died prior to the project commencing, by agreeing to be included but having since died, and by being alive.

Deceased prior to project start
Members of this group had no influence on their inclusion as one of the Twelve Local Heroes, as they had died before the decision was made to create a memorial.

Deceased since project start
Members of this group were asked and agreed to be included as one of the Twelve Local Heroes, but have since died.

Living
Members of this group were asked and agreed to be included as one of the Twelve Local Heroes, and are still alive today.

The sculptures have been temporarily removed from their current position on Worcester Blvd to facilitate the post earthquake restoration of the Engineering block of the Arts Centre of Christchurch. Following the restoration, it is envisaged that they will return.

References

2009 sculptures
Bronze sculptures in New Zealand
Outdoor sculptures in Christchurch
Christchurch Central City
Culture in Christchurch
Monuments and memorials in New Zealand
Tourist attractions in Christchurch
Monuments and memorials to women
Statues in New Zealand
Sculptures of women in New Zealand
Cultural depictions of New Zealand men
Cultural depictions of New Zealand women
Cultural depictions of 20th-century painters
Cultural depictions of activists
Cultural depictions of businesspeople
Cultural depictions of writers
Statues of writers
Cultural depictions of physicians
Cultural depictions of cricketers
Statues of sportspeople
Cultural depictions of architects